Basile Camerling (born 29 April 1987) is a French footballer who plays for UN Käerjéng 97 on loan from CS Fola Esch.

Career 
On 21 September 2009, AS Nancy loaned the striker to SC Amiens, after he had played the prior half-year on loan for the Clermont Foot.

In October 2013, he went on trial with English championship club Bolton Wanderers, having also spent time on trial with Queens Park Rangers and Charlton Athletic.  At the end of the trial, Camerling was not offered a contract; Bolton Manager Dougie Freedman explained the reason he was not offered a contract: "He is a good player but he's probably a couple of months away from fitness and in the end that's exactly why we couldn't sign him".

References

External links
 Player profile at L'Equipe
 ASNL.net
 Player Profile foot-national.com

1987 births
Living people
People from Laxou
French footballers
AS Nancy Lorraine players
Clermont Foot players
SR Colmar players
Ligue 1 players
Association football forwards
Sportspeople from Meurthe-et-Moselle
Footballers from Grand Est
French expatriate footballers
French expatriate sportspeople in Luxembourg
Expatriate footballers in Luxembourg